The 1936 World Table Tennis Championships women's doubles was the ninth edition of the women's doubles championship.
Marie Šmídová and Marie Kettnerová defeated Věra Votrubcová and Vlasta Depetrisová in the final by three sets to one.

Results

See also
List of World Table Tennis Championships medalists

References

-
-